Michael Martin Uhlmann (December 29, 1939 – October 8, 2019) was an American political scientist. He was Professor of Government in the Department of Politics and Government at Claremont Graduate University and Claremont McKenna College. Prior to teaching at Claremont, Uhlmann was a senior fellow at the Ethics and Public Policy Center, Vice President for Public Policy Research at the Bradley Foundation in Milwaukee, Wisconsin, and taught at the Antonin Scalia Law School.

Early life and education
Uhlmann was born on December 29, 1939, in Washington, D.C. He graduated from The Hill School in 1958. He received his undergraduate degree from Yale University, a Juris Doctor from the University of Virginia School of Law, and a Ph.D. from Claremont Graduate University.

Career 
Before beginning his career as an academic, Uhlmann served as Assistant Attorney General for the Office of Legislative Affairs during the Ford Administration from 1975 to 1977, and as special assistant to the President during Ronald Reagan’s first term in office. He also spent several years as a partner at the Washington, D.C. office of Pepper Hamilton., where he specialized in federal antitrust, administrative, and environmental law. In 1989, Uhlmann discovered that President Bush planned to appoint him to the United States Court of Appeals for the District of Columbia Circuit, and declined the position so that he could prioritize family life.

In 2002, Uhlmann became a Professor Government at Claremont Graduate University, where his specialty was the American presidency, congressional-executive relations, and the federal judiciary.

In 1979, Michael Uhlmann was profiled in The New York Times by Arthur O. Sulzberger Jr. for his work as President of the National Legal Center for the Public Interest.

Prof. Uhlmann was a frequent contributor to the Claremont Review of Books, most recently with the articles, “The Supreme Court v. the Constitution of the United States of America”, and “The Right Stuff”, a panegyric of the life, writings, and talent of William F. Buckley, Jr. Other articles written by Uhlmann have appeared in the Los Angeles Times, National Review, The American Spectator, Washington Times, Crisis, and The Human Life Review.

His final book was Last Rights?: Assisted Suicide and Euthanasia Debated. Additionally, his work The Electoral College: Proven Constitutional Pillar of Freedom includes his 1970 testimony before the Senate Judiciary Committee defending the propriety of the Electoral College and discussing the central role this provision serves in the constitutional structure of America.

Personal life 
Uhlmann died on October 8, 2019, in Newport Beach, California.
He was survived by 5 children and 10 grandchildren.

References

2019 deaths
Governmental studies academics
Yale University alumni
University of Virginia School of Law alumni
1939 births
Claremont Graduate University alumni
The Hill School alumni
Claremont Graduate University faculty
American political scientists